Do you give Balkandzhi Yovo, nice Yana to the Turkish faith?  is a reworked text by Pencho Slaveikov based on the Bulgarian folk song  „Come on, give it, Nikola”, recorded and first published by Stjepan Verković in 1860 in the collection „Folk Songs of the Macedonian Bulgarians”. It is presumed the original song was performed in the villages of Skotoussa and the extinct village of Krasohori, (near Agkistro), both in Greece today. Some authors suppose this song is possibly a deception. It reflects the events surrounding the uprising in Yana.

References

See also 
Bulgarian folklore

Bulgarian folklore
Macedonia under the Ottoman Empire
1860 songs